Wojnowice  is a village in the administrative district of Gmina Krzanowice, within Racibórz County, Silesian Voivodeship, in southern Poland, close to the Czech border.

The village has a population of 1,100.

Notable residents
 Otto Höhne (1895-1969), Luftwaffe officer

Gallery

References 

Wojnowice